El chofer, is a Mexican telenovela produced by Guillermo Diazayas for Televisa in 1974. Starring Jorge Rivero and Linda Cristal.

Cast 
Jorge Rivero as José
Linda Cristal as Julia
Milton Rodríguez as Luigi
Susana Alexander as Tania
Susana Dosamantes as Pilar
Carlos Piñar as Andrés
Olga Breeskin as Nora
Jorge Vargas as Manuel
Anita Blanch as Carmelita
Sonia Furió as Soledad
Sergio Jimenez as Rogelio
Pilar Pellicer as Silvia
Armando Silvestre as Armando
Socorro Avelar as Olvido
Silvia Mariscal
Guillermo Zarur as Lobitos
Lourdes Canale as Lulu
Nelly Menden

References

External links 

Mexican telenovelas
1974 telenovelas
Televisa telenovelas
Spanish-language telenovelas
1974 Mexican television series debuts
1974 Mexican television series endings